The Raeffsky Islands or Raevski Islands ( or Îles Raevski) is a subgroup with just over 3000 people in the Tuamotu group in French Polynesia. They are located roughly in the central area of the main Tuamotu atoll cluster. (Latitude: 16° 45' 0 S, Longitude: 144° 13' 60 W.) Named after Nikolay Raevsky, a Russian general of the Napoleonic wars.

Atolls
The Raeffsky Islands include the following atolls:

Anaa
Faaite
Tahanea (uninhabited)
Motutunga (uninhabited) 
Takume
Raroia
Taenga
Nihiru
Makemo
Katiu
Tuanake (uninhabited)
Hiti (uninhabited)
Tepoto (South), Tepoto Sud (uninhabited)
Marutea Nord (uninhabited)
Haraiki (uninhabited)
Aratika
Kauehi
Taiaro (private)
Raraka

Administration
The commune of Anaa consists of 4 atolls: Anaa, Faaite, Tahanea and Motutunga. The total population is of 639 inhabitants according to the 2002 census.
The commune of Makemo consists of 11 atolls: Makemo, Takume, Raroia, Taenga, Nihiru, Kaitu, Tuanake, Hiti, Tepoto (South) (Tepoto Sud), Marutea Nord and Haraiki. The total population is of 964 inhabitants according to the 2002 census.
The commune of Fakarava consists of 7 atolls in Raeffsky Group: Fakarava, Aratika, Kauehi, Niau, Raraka, Taiaro and Toau. The total population is of 1511 inhabitants.

UNESCO site
The ring-shaped atoll Taiaro provides a rare example of a coral reef with a fully enclosed lagoon. The atoll was officially designated as a UNESCO biosphere reserve in 1977.

References

External links
Raeffsky Islands Map

Atolls of the Tuamotus
Archipelagoes of the Pacific Ocean